The  was promoted by Japanese author Kita Ikki in the 1930s, with the goal of restoring power to the newly enthroned Emperor Shōwa and abolishing the liberal Taishō democracy. The aims of the "Shōwa Restoration" were similar to the Meiji Restoration as the groups who envisioned it imagined a small group of qualified people backing up a strong Emperor. The Cherry Blossom Society envisioned such a restoration.

The February 26 Incident was an attempt to bring it about, failing heavily because they were unable to secure the support of the Emperor. The chief conspirators surrendered in the hope to make their trial advance the cause, a hope which was foiled by the trials being conducted secretly.

Although all such attempts failed, it was a first step on the rise of Japanese militarism.

References

 
Empire of Japan
Japanese militarism
Shōwa period
Hirohito